Allock is an unincorporated community and coal town in Perry County, Kentucky, United States. Its post office closed in 1995.

References

Unincorporated communities in Perry County, Kentucky
Unincorporated communities in Kentucky
Coal towns in Kentucky